Portal del Tunal is a terminal station of the TransMilenio mass-transit system of Bogotá, Colombia, opened in the year 2000.

Location 
Portal del Tunal is located in southern Bogotá, in front of the Parque El Tunal, specifically at the intersection of Avenida Boyacá with Avenida Ciudad de Villavicencio.

History 
In 2002, one month after the opening of Portal del Norte, Portal del Tunal was opened as the fourth terminal station in the TransMilenio system.

Station services

Old trunk services

Current Trunk Services

Feeder services 
The following feeder routes also work:
  circular to the Candelaria neighborhood
  circulate to San Francisco neighborhood
  circulate to the Sierra Morena neighborhood
  move to the neighborhood Paraíso 
  circulate to El Tesoro neighborhood (Extension to Arabia in peak hours)
  circulate to the Juan José Rondón neighborhood (Peak hours)
  circulate to San Joaquin neighborhood
  circulate to Vista Hermosa neighborhood (Peak hours)
  circulate to the neighborhood Arborizadora Alta
  circulate to the Villa Gloria neighborhood

Special Services 
The following Special route also works, which is accessed by AV Boyacá:
  Circular to the Pasquilla Street
Making use of the feeder service 6-4 Paraíso, you can access the following special routes in the Illimaní Park:
  circulate to Bella Flor neighborhood
  circulate in the Quiba Path

See also 
 Bogotá
 TransMilenio
 List of TransMilenio stations

External links 
 TransMilenio

TransMilenio